The  was a Japanese Dai-ichi Taifuku Maru-class cargo ship, which was built in 1918 at Kawasaki Dockyard in Kobe, Japan, and owned by Kawasaki Kisen Kaisha, Ltd. In April 1925, it sank in a heavy storm during a voyage from Boston, USA, to Hamburg, Germany, with a cargo of wheat and a crew of thirty-eight, all of whom were lost.

The sinking
The Raifuku Maru had sailed out of Boston on 18 April 1925. On 21 April, it sailed into a heavy storm, and the cargo of wheat began to shift, causing the ship to take on an increasing list to one side. The RMS Homeric, a liner of the White Star Line, and several other vessels received the following communication from the Japanese ship's wireless operator, Masao Hiwatari: "Now very danger! Come quick!" Despite the broken English of the Japanese crewmen, it was obvious that the vessel was in trouble. The Homeric (along with the British vessel King Alexander) tried desperately to reach the Raifuku Maru, but was unable to get close enough to rescue any crew due to the rough seas. The vessel was listing at a 30-degree angle, and sank with all hands while the Homerics crew and passengers watched. The Homeric sent the following message to the Camperdown Signal Station: "OBSERVED STEAMER RAIFUKU MARU SINK IN LAT 4143N LONG 6139W REGRET UNABLE TO SAVE ANY LIVES." Several vessels attempted to locate bodies or survivors from the ship in the days after the sinking, but found none.

The incident was quite controversial at the time; when the Homeric arrived in New York, several of the passengers publicly accused the crew of the Homeric of not making enough effort to save the Raifuku Marus crewmen. This was taken up by the Japanese government, who accused the English captains of racism for not saving their crewmen. However this was strenuously denied by the crew of the Homeric and the White Star Line who argued that they had made every effort to rescue the crew.

Myths and legends
Several early reports of the incident, including those of the Associated Press, claimed that Hiwatari sent a frantic message reading "Danger like dagger now!" The source of this quote is unknown, since it isn't included in radio logs or official records of the incident, but appears in many early accounts of the Raifuku Maru'''s sinking. Divorced of its original context, the "dagger" comment became the basis for a popular legend that the ship disappeared without a trace after sending the message. Later writers speculated over what the "dagger" was (with waterspouts and UFOs frequently blamed), and the incident became remembered as a genuine mystery of the sea. Popular writers on the Bermuda Triangle, specifically Charles Berlitz and Richard Winer, propagated the myth of the vessel's "mysterious" sinking.

Newspaper references
"Japanese Ships Sinks With A Crew Of 38; Liners Unable To Aid" New York Times, April 22, 1925.
"Passengers Differ On Homeric Effort To Save Sinking Ship" New York Times, April 23, 1925.
"Homeric Captain Upheld By Skippers" New York Times, April 24, 1925.
"Liner Is Battered In Rescue Attempt" New York Times'', April 25, 1925.

References

1918 ships
Maritime incidents in 1925
Cargo ships
Merchant ships of Japan
Ships of the Kawasaki Kisen
Shipwrecks in the Atlantic Ocean
Ships built by Kawasaki Heavy Industries